Sengupta is a surname found among Bengalis of West Bengal and Bangladesh. They belong to the Baidya caste. The surname is a compound of Sen and Gupta.

Baidyas, a caste (jāti) of Ayurvedic physicians, along with Brahmins and Kayasthas, are regarded among the top three higher castes that comprise the "upper layer of Hindu society".  In the colonial era, the Bhadraloks of Bengal were drawn from these three castes, who continue to maintain a collective hegemony in West Bengal.

Geographical distribution
As of 2014, 67.8% of all known bearers of the surname Sengupta were residents of India and 22.5% were residents of Bangladesh. In India, the frequency of the surname was higher than national average in the following states and union territories:
 1. West Bengal (1: 1,621)
 2. Tripura (1: 9,413)
 3. Arunachal Pradesh (1: 10,887)
 4. Delhi (1: 11,950)
 5. Andaman and Nicobar Islands (1: 14,613)

Notables 
Achintyakumar Sengupta (1903–1976), Bengali author
Aditya Vikram Sengupta (born 1983), Indian film director, cinematographer and graphic designer
Anasuya Sengupta, Indian poet, author, activist
Anita Sengupta, British-born American aerospace engineer
Anup Sengupta, Bengali film director and producer
Apoorva Sengupta (1939–2013), Indian cricketer
Arjun Kumar Sengupta (1937–2010), Indian politician and Member of the Parliament of India
Arunabha Sengupta (born 1973), Indian novelist
Atiha Sen Gupta (born 1988), British playwright and screenwriter
Barkha Sengupta (born 1979), Indian television and film actress
Barun Sengupta (1934–2008), Bengali journalist and founder-editor of Bartaman newspaper
Biswatosh Sengupta (born 1944), Indian academic from Kolkata
Bonny Sengupta, Indian Bengali film actor
Bratin Sengupta (born 1963), Indian politician
Deep Sengupta (born 1988), Indian chess grandmaster
Gurunath Sengupta (1848–1914), Sanskrit scholar from the Jessore District of Bangladesh
Hindol Sengupta, (born 1979), Indian historian and journalist
Hiranmay Sen Gupta (born 1934), Bangladeshi nuclear physicist
Indraneil Sengupta, Indian model and actor, born in Assam
Jatindra Mohan Sengupta (1885–1933), Indian revolutionary, President of then Bengal Provincial Congress Committee and Bengal Swaraj Party
Jatindranath Sengupta (1887–1954), Bengali poet and writer
Jisshu Sengupta, also known as Jisshu, Bengali film actor
Joy Sengupta (born 1968), Indian film and stage actor
Joya Sengupta, Bangladesh Awami League politician, doctor
Kalyan Jyoti Sengupta (born 1953), Indian lawyer, Chief Justice of Andhra Pradesh High Court
Krishnendu Sengupta (born 1970), Indian professor of theoretical physics
Mallika Sengupta (1960–2011), Bengali poet, feminist, and reader of Sociology from Kolkata
Mihir Sengupta, Bengali Indian writer
Moinak Sengupta (born 1973), Indian cricketer
N. C. Sen Gupta, the eleventh Governor of the Reserve Bank of India from 19 May to 19 August 1975
Narendra Nath Sen Gupta (1889–1944), Indian psychologist, philosopher, and professor
Nares Chandra Sen-Gupta (1882–1964), legal scholar and Bengali novelist
Nellie Sengupta (1886–1973), Englishwoman who fought for Indian Independence
Nikhil Baran Sengupta (1943–2014), Indian art director of Oriya films
Niranjan Sen Gupta, Bengali Indian revolutionary
Nitish Sengupta (1933–2013), Revenue Secretary of the Government of India
Papiya Sengupta, Indian television actress
Partho Sen-Gupta (born 1965), Indian-born French independent film director and screenwriter
Paulami Sengupta, the editor of three magazines in India: Anandamela, Unish Kuri and Career
Phani Gopal Sen Gupta (born 1905), Indian politician, member of Lok Sabha from Purnia (1952–1970)
Piya Sengupta (born 1969), Indian film actress, producer, director and writer
Poile Sengupta (born 1948), Indian writer, playwright and actress
Prabodh Chandra Sengupta (1876–1962), historian of astronomy in ancient India
Pramod Ranjan Sengupta (1907–1974), Marxist intellectual and Bengali revolutionary
Priti Sengupta, Gujarati poet and writer
Pulak Sengupta (born 1963), Indian petrologist
Ramananda Sengupta (1916–2017), Indian cinematographer
Ratnottama Sengupta (born 1955), Indian film journalist, festival curator, and author
Rituparna Sengupta (born 1971), Indian actress in Bengali and Hindi films
Rudraprasad Sengupta (born 1935), Bengali Indian actor, director and cultural critic
Sachin Sengupta (1891–1961), Bengali playwright and theatre producer and director
Sagar Sengupta (born 1968), Indian immunologist and cancer biologist
Shantanu Sengupta, Indian cell biologist
Sohini Sengupta, Indian film and theatre actress
Stephanie Sengupta, American producer and writer
Subodh Chandra Sengupta (1903–1998), Indian academic and critic of English literature, Shakespearean scholar
Sudipta Sengupta (born 1946), professor in structural geology in Jadavpur University, Calcutta, India
Sukhamoy Sen Gupta, Chief Minister of Tripura in India from 1972 to 1977
Suranjit Sengupta (1945–2017), senior Bangladesh Awami League politician
Swatilekha Sengupta (1950–2021), Bengali actress
Tarakeswar Sengupta (1905–1931), Indian independence activist
Upal Sengupta, lead vocalist of Bengali band Chandrabinoo
Ushoshi Sengupta (born 1988), Indian beauty pageant contestant and winner of Miss India Universe 2010

See also
Baidya
Dasgupta

References

 Bose, Nirmal Kumar (1994). Structure of Hindu Society. Orient BlackSwan. p. 163. .
 Leslie, Charles M. (1976). Asian Medical Systems: A Comparative Study. University of California Press. p. 37. .

Hindu surnames
Bengali Hindu surnames